Events from the year 1911 in Croatia.

Incumbents
Ruler of Austria-Hungary – Franz Joseph I
Ban of Kingdom of Croatia-Slavonia – Nikola Tomašić

Events
The Union chocolate factory (present-day Kraš) opened in Zagreb.
Slavoljub Penkala and Edmund Moster opened the Penkala-Moster pen and pencil company (present-day TOZ-Penkala) in Zagreb.

Arts and literature
January 12 – Blagoje Bersa's opera Oganj (Der Eisenhammer) premiered at the Croatian National Theatre in Zagreb.
Ante Kovačić published his novel  (originally published as a serial in Vienac in 1888).
Dinko Šimunović published his novel Tuđinac.

Sport
February 13 – Foundation of HNK Hajduk Split football club.
April 26 – Foundation of 1. HŠK Građanski football club.

Births
February 4 – Antun Nalis, actor (died 2000).
April 13 – Ico Hitrec, footballer (died 1946).
October 28 – Rade Končar, communist leader and World War II resistance fighter (died 1942).

Full date unknown
Slavko Kodrnja, footballer (died 1970).

Deaths
June 18 – Franjo Kuhač, conductor and musicologist (born 1834).
July 16 – August Harambašić, writer, publisher and translator (born 1861).
December 17 – Josip Frank, politician (born 1844).

Full date unknown
 Leo Hönigsberg, architect (born 1861).

References

 
Years of the 20th century in Croatia
Croatia, 1911 In